Ivan Alekseyevich Usov (born 7 October 1977 in Krasnoyarsk) is a freestyle swimmer from Russia. He won a gold medal in the 4×100 freestyle relay at the 2003 World Aquatics Championships and silver in the 4×100 freestyle at the 2004 European Championships in Madrid. He represented his native country at the 2004 Summer Olympics in Athens, where he swam in the preliminary heats of the 4 × 100 m freestyle.

References

External links 

 Ivan Usov on the right

1977 births
Living people
Russian male swimmers
Olympic swimmers of Russia
Swimmers at the 2004 Summer Olympics
Russian male freestyle swimmers
World Aquatics Championships medalists in swimming
European Aquatics Championships medalists in swimming
Sportspeople from Krasnoyarsk